Christine Stansell (born 1949) is an American historian in women's and gender history; antebellum US social and political history; American cultural history; history of human rights; and post-catastrophic societies. She received her PhD from Yale University in 1979. She recently retired from teaching history at the University of Chicago, where she had lectured since 2007.

Stansell's books have received mostly positive reviews.

Bibliography

References

External links 
 

21st-century American historians
Living people
1949 births
Princeton University alumni
Yale University alumni
University of Chicago faculty
Women's historians